Cost efficiency (or cost optimality), in the context of parallel computer algorithms, refers to a measure of how effectively parallel computing can be used to solve a particular problem. A parallel algorithm is considered cost efficient if its asymptotic running time multiplied by the number of processing units involved in the computation is comparable to the running time of the best sequential algorithm.

Cost efficiency also has applications to human services.

References
Advanced Computer Architectures: A Design Space Approach, D. Sima, T. Fountain and P. Kacsuk, Addison-Wesley, 1997.

Parallel computing

es:análisis de coste-beneficio
sv:Kostnads-effekt-analys